Rashed Eisa Al Falasi; born 24 August 1990), commonly known as Rashed Eisa, is an Emirati footballer, who plays for as a midfielder.

He competed for United Arab Emirates in the 2012 Summer Olympics.

References

1990 births
Living people
Emirati footballers
Association football midfielders
United Arab Emirates international footballers
Footballers at the 2012 Summer Olympics
Olympic footballers of the United Arab Emirates
Al-Wasl F.C. players
Al Ain FC players
Al Shabab Al Arabi Club Dubai players
Al-Nasr SC (Dubai) players
Khor Fakkan Sports Club players
Al-Arabi SC (UAE) players
UAE Pro League players
UAE First Division League players